Sucre Municipality is a municipality in Falcón State, Venezuela.

Name
The municipality is one of several in Venezuela named "Sucre Municipality" in honour of Venezuelan independence hero Antonio José de Sucre.

Municipalities of Falcón